George Gilbert Scott (1811–78) was an English architect.  Following his training, in 1836 he started working with William Bonython Moffatt, and they entered into partnership, initially specialising in designing workhouses.  Scott became increasingly interested in the Gothic style, and the design of churches in this style.  The partnership was dissolved in 1846, and Scott then set up his own office.  He became "known primarily as a church architect", and as such he designed many new churches, and restored many more.  In addition he designed monuments and memorials, public buildings including government offices, educational buildings, commercial buildings, and houses.

This list contains new churches designed by Scott in the north of England, more specifically in the North West, North East, and Yorkshire and the Humber regions.  It is not complete, not least because some of the churches have been demolished.



Key

Churches

References

Citations

Sources

Scott, George Gilbert
Churches,Northern England